Taliesin Associated Architects was an architectural firm founded by apprentices of Frank Lloyd Wright to carry on his architectural vision after his death in 1959. The firm disbanded in 2003.

It was headquartered at Taliesin West in Scottsdale, Arizona and had up to 14 principals who had all worked under Wright.  One of their first major projects was the Rocky Mountain National Park Administration Building, part of Mission 66 for the National Park Service.  Along with original work such as the Kaden Tower (originally "Lincoln Tower", Louisville, Kentucky, 1966), the firm completed several of Wright's unbuilt designs, and performed renovation and expansion, for instance at the Arizona Biltmore Hotel in Phoenix.

The first managing principal was Wright's protégé and son-in-law William Wesley Peters, until his death in 1991. Other TAA architects included Charles Montooth, John Rattenbury and Vernon Swaback.

Selected works

References

External links
New York Times Article

Defunct architecture firms based in Arizona
Frank Lloyd Wright
Design companies established in 1959
Design companies disestablished in 2003
1959 establishments in Arizona
2003 disestablishments in Arizona